Johannes Josephus Destrée (27 March 1827 in Laeken - 17 March 1888 in The Hague) was a Belgian landscape artist.

Biography
According to the RKD he was a pupil of Bartholomeus Johannes van Hove and Andreas Schelfhout who later joined the Pulchri studio. He travelled to Germany and worked in Oosterbeek, near Arnhem.

References 

Johannes Josephus Destree on Artnet

External links 

 Thieme-Becker.Allgemeines Lexikon der bildenden Künstler von der Antike bis zur Gegenwart

Belgian landscape painters
Dutch painters
Dutch male painters
1827 births
1888 deaths
People from Laeken
Artists from The Hague
19th-century Belgian painters
19th-century Belgian male artists